Heather DeLoach is an American actress. She is best known for her portrayal of the tap dancing "Bee Girl" in the 1992 music video for the hit single "No Rain", by Blind Melon. She also appeared in two episodes of the medical drama ER.

Blind Melon vocalist Shannon Hoon described DeLoach in the months that followed as "signing autographs and hobnobbing with the heavy hitters." "I heard she was hanging out with Madonna at the MTV Awards", Hoon added.

Georgia Graham, Blind Melon drummer Glen Graham’s younger sister, not DeLoach, appears on the cover of the band's eponymous debut album. Band members spotted the old family photo from a "long-ago school play" while visiting Graham's boyhood home.

DeLoach reprised her role as Bee Girl for the 1993 music video "Bedrock Anthem" by "Weird Al" Yankovic. The song "Bee Girl" on the album Lost Dogs by Pearl Jam is a tribute to DeLoach.

DeLoach married financial advisor Matt Greiner in 2017 after the couple met online. The wedding included nods to the Blind Melon video with several bumblebee details. Today, DeLoach represents a fertility doctor in Orange County, California. In October 2020, she appeared as "Bee Girl" on the Fox musical game show I Can See Your Voice.

Filmography

References

External links 
 
 "No Rain" Music Video

20th-century American actresses
21st-century American actresses
Actresses from California
American child actresses
American film actresses
American television actresses
Living people
Place of birth missing (living people)
Year of birth missing (living people)